The 1985 Labatt Brier was held from March 3 to 10 at the Moncton Coliseum in Moncton, New Brunswick.

Al Hackner of Northern Ontario defeated Pat Ryan of Alberta to win his second Brier title.

Teams

Round-robin standings

Round-robin results

Draw 1

Draw 2

Draw 3

Draw 4

Draw 5

Draw 6

Draw 7

Draw 8

Draw 9

Draw 10

Draw 11

Draw 12

Draw 13

Draw 14

Draw 15

Tiebreakers

Round 1

Round 2

Playoffs

Semifinal

Final

The Hackner double

Hackner found himself in a two-point deficit coming into the tenth end, and he was forced to make a very tough double takeout and stick his shooter in order to tie the game. The shot allowed him to steal a point in the extra end when Ryan was heavy with his last stone.

Results

Statistics

Top 5 player percentages
Round Robin only

Team percentages
Round Robin only

Awards and honours
The all-star teams and award winners are as follows:

All-Star Teams
First Team
Skip:  Pat Ryan
Third:  Dave Iverson
Second:  Don McKenzie
Lead:  Bill Fletcher

Second Team
Skip:  Don Aitken
Third:  Rick Lang (N. Ont.)
Second:  Ian Tetley (N. Ont.)
Lead:  Don Walchuk

Ross Harstone Award
 Dan Hildebrand, Manitoba lead

References

Labatt Brier
1985
Curling competitions in Moncton
Labatt Brier
Labatt Brier